Lesidren is a village in Ugarchin Municipality, Lovech Province, northern Bulgaria.

References

Villages in Lovech Province